Declan Patton (born 23 May 1995) is a rugby league footballer who plays as a  or  for the Bradford Bulls in the Championship and the England Knights at international level.

He previously played for the Warrington Wolves in the Super League, and on loan from Warrington at the Rochdale Hornets in League 1 and the Championship, and also the Widnes Vikings in the Betfred Championship.

Background
Patton was born in Warrington, Cheshire, England.

Playing career

Warrington
Patton made his début in 2015 against Wakefield Trinity.

He moved to Warrington in 2015 after being signed from Leigh. He mainly played reserve matches eventually making his way into the starting squad due to injuries.
He has spent time on loan at Rochdale in League 1 and the Championship.

He played in the 20-6 win v Hull FC to secure the 2016 League Leaders' Shield. Since then Patton began to make a big impression scoring important tries and helping Warrington win many games throughout the season. Patton played in the 2016 Super League Grand Final against Wigan. He scored Warrington's only try putting them 6–2 up. However Wigan came back and won 12–6 at Old Trafford.
Patton played in the 2018 Challenge Cup Final defeat by the Catalans Dragons at Wembley Stadium.
Patton played in the 2018 Super League Grand Final defeat by Wigan at Old Trafford.
Patton played in the 2019 Challenge Cup Final victory over St Helens at Wembley Stadium.

Salford
On 22 January 2021, it was reported that he had signed for Salford in the Super League.

International career
In 2018 he was selected for the England Knights on their tour of Papua New Guinea. He played against Papua New Guinea at the Lae Football Stadium and the Oil Search National Football Stadium.

References

External links
Warrington Wolves profile
SL profile
Declan Patton signs new contract with Warrington Wolves

1995 births
Living people
Bradford Bulls players
England Knights national rugby league team players
English rugby league players
Rochdale Hornets players
Rugby league five-eighths
Rugby league players from Warrington
Salford Red Devils players
Warrington Wolves players
Widnes Vikings players